is a private university in Tamana, Kumamoto, Japan, established in 1998.

External links
 Official website

Educational institutions established in 1998
Private universities and colleges in Japan
Universities and colleges in Kumamoto Prefecture
1998 establishments in Japan